TWTV7 is a marketwide cable station on Time Warner Cable systems in two markets:

 Albany, New York, where it is a regional advertising channel.
 El Paso, Texas, where it a regional access channel and the market's UPN affiliate (and for a time also carried WB programming).